Priors Hardwick is a village and civil parish in the Stratford district of Warwickshire, England. The population of the civil parish as taken at the 2011 census was 172. The name derives from the fact that it was originally a manor belonging to the Priors of Coventry.

History 
The oldest houses in the village are centred on the village green, with The Butcher's Arms dated as 1562, although some sources place it back as far as 1375.

The proximity to the drover's road known as the Welsh Road influenced the village and the naming of local landmarks.  The cattle drovers used to water their animals at a pond outside the village, which resulted in it being named Cowpool. This is unusual, since locally, such waterholes were named pits, rather than the Welsh-derived name pool (pwyll).  London End in the village, and various buildings with welsh in their name also derive from the closeness of the road.

The original settlement is on the government's list of Scheduled Ancient Monuments with most of the village being enclosed in a Conservation Area.

Until 1974, the parish belonged to the Southam Rural District.

Population 
According to census information the population figures have been:
 in 1831 there were 69 males aged over 20
 Total Population

Agriculture 

In an 1801 survey the agricultural output of the parish was:

Occupations 
In an 1831 study the following occupations were categorised:

Population
According to the 2001 census, the parish consists of 79 households with a population of 167 (80 males and 87 females). Of the 79 households, 63 were owner-occupied, 4 were rented from the council, and 12 were rented from a private landlord. 11 households had no car or van, 27 had one car or van, 23 had two and 18 had three or more. the mean population age was 43.88 and the median was 46. The average distance travelled to a fixed place of work was 24.25 km.

Landmarks 
The major business in the village is The Butcher's Arms, originally a pub, now a Portuguese restaurant. 
The Anglican parish church of St Mary is a Grade II* listed building, with parts dating from the 12th century.  It is part of the Bridges Group of Parishes.

References

External links

 Priors Hardwick village website
 Windows on Warwickshire – Priors Hardwick pictures

Villages in Warwickshire